The following is a list of mayors and equivalent officials of the city of Algiers, Algeria.

Mayors
 Ahmed Bouderba, 1830–1831
 Charles Branthome, 1831–1841
 Clément, circa 1841
 Huber, 1841–1842
 François de , 1842–1848
 Lechêne, 1848–1853
 Jean-Baptiste Vincent de Guiroye, 1853–1858
 Jean-Jules Sarlande, circa 1858–1867
 Jean François Joseph Gastu, 1871–1873
 Romuald Vuillermoz, 1873–1874
 Adolphe Blasselle, 1874
 Mongellas, 1876–1878
 Jean-Jude Feuillet, 1878–1881
 Guillemin, 1881–1898
 Max Régis, 1898–1899
 Voinot, 1899–1901
 Jean Antonini, 1901–1902
 Altairac, 1902–1908
 Savignon, 1908–1910
 Charles De Galland, 1910–1919
 Alphonse Raffi, 1924–1929
 Brunel, 1929–1936
 Augustin Rozis, 1936–1942
 Peisson, 1942–1943
 Marcel Duclos, 1943–1944
 Murat, 1944–1945
 , 1945–1947
 Pierre-René Gazagne, 1947–1953
 Jacques Chevallier, 1953–1958
 Omar Mohamed Bouarouba, 1958–1960
 Charles Corbin, 1960–1961
 Joseph Lounes Hattab-Pacha, 1961–1962

Presidents of Conseil Populaire de la Ville d'Alger

 Bachir Mentouri, 1967–1975
 Mustapha Medjaoui, circa 1977
 Khelifa Belaid, 1980–1985
 Smaïl Tifaoui, circa 1995

See also
 Algiers#Government (fr) 
 Timeline of Algiers

References

This article incorporates information from the French Wikipedia.

Algiers
Algiers
Algiers